Jerome Thomas Veleeparambil, more popularly known by his stage name Jerry Amaldev (born 15 April 1939) is a three-time Kerala State Film Awards winning Indian composer of film scores who has given music to some of the most important motion pictures of Malayalam cinema. He is noted for his lyrical and expressive melodies together with simple but rich tonal compositions of Indian music.

Biography
Jerry Amaldev was born into a Malabar Latin Catholic family belonging to Archdiocese of Verapoly on 15 April 1939 in Kochi, Cochin State, to V. C. Joseph and Mary Joseph. He completed his high school education in 1955 from St. Albert's High School, Ernakulam. He Obtained the degree of Bachelor of Philosophy from the Papal Athenaeum, Pune. He is considered one of the evergreen music directors in Mollywood, even though he worked for a small span. His notable films as a music director are Manjil Virinja Pookkal,  Aparahnam, Ennennum Kannettante, Ente Mamattikkuttiyammakku, Nokketha Dhoorathu Kannum Nattu, and Guruji oru Vakku.. He received  "Kerala State Film Awards" three times as a music director. However he suddenly disappeared from Malayalam industry in and around the time of millennium, for reasons that are unclear, leaving his rich composition for the Malayalam films.

Film career
Jerry Amaldev debuted in Malayalam industry through Fazil's Manjil Virinja Pookkal in 1980 and won the Kerala State Award for excellence in Music Direction for the same. Before that, he used to work as assistant to the great Indian Music Director Naushad. He was trained in North Indian Vocal Music under Madhusoondan Patwardhan of Vishnu Digambar Sangeet Vidyalaya, Pune. Since the debut was a hit in Malayalam he got really busy in Mollywood and had worked for around 75 films. He had conducted musical ceremony during the Pope's visit of India with choir of 500 and an orchestra of 40. He had also composed songs for some Bollywood movies.

But during the early time of millennium he suddenly disappeared from Malayalam industries. No.1 Snehatheeram Bangalore North is the last known film that he had composed for any Malayalam films. After quitting Malayalam film industry he started teaching music at the American International School, Chennai.  He is now working at Choice School, Cochin, where he teaches school students music along with composing music for various socially relevant films and television serials. He now teaches at the Asian Christian College of Music - www.accm.org.in, Kottayam as the professor to History of Music & Conducting where he is the academic adviser.

He made a comeback in 2016 by being the music director for the songs in the film Action Hero Biju directed by Abrid Shine, and starring Nivin Pauly.

Family
He was married to Jolly Jerry Amaldev, and has three daughters Meera, Sangeeta and Dahlia. His wife died in 2008 due to cancer. Currently he lives in Palatty, Kannachanthodu Road, Kochi.

Awards
 Kerala State Film Award for Best Music Director - 1980 - Manjil Virinja Pookkal
 Kerala State Film Award for Best Music Director - 1990 - Aparahnam [ Shared with Perumbavoor G. Raveendranath - Innale ]
 Kerala State Film Award for Best Background Music - 1995 - Kazhakam
 Kerala Sangeetha Nataka Akademi Award for Light Music - 2001
 Several Critics Award

Partial Discography

Notable Malayalam songs
 Aayiram Kannumayi Kathirunnu
-   Nokkethadhoorathu Kannum Nattu
 Raave Nilaave         -   Raave Nilaave
 Pookkal Panineer Pookkal- Action Hero Biju
 Oonjalilaadi Vanna - Action Hero Biju
 Deva Dumdubi         -    Ennennum Kannettante
 Poovataka            -    Ennennum Kannettante
 Vaachalam En Mounavum  -    Koodum Thedi
 Penninte Chenchundil   -    Guruji Oru Vakku
 Alorungi Arongorungi -    Ente Mamattykuttiammaku
 Manjanikombil        -    Manjil Virinja Pookakl
 Kiliye               -    Nokketha Dhoorathu Kannum Nattu
 Mizhiyoram Nananjozhukum -Manjil Virinja Pookkal
 Athapoovum Nulli     -
 Pavizhamalli Poothulanja - Sanmanassullavarkku Samadhanam
 Kanninu Ponkani     -
 Kur Kur Kurmozhikal     - Ariyathe(1986 Film Not Released)
 Poomukile               - Ariyathe(1986 Film Not Released)
 Poovalla poonthaliralla - Kaattupothu(Film Not Released)
 Mele mele maanam - No. 1 Snehatheeram Bangalore North
 Kokkorusumen- No. 1 Snehatheeram Bangalore North
 Ponnambili pottum - No. 1 Snehatheeram Bangalore North
 Apom chuttu - No. 1 Snehatheeram Bangalore North

References

External links
http://www.jerryamaldev.com - Official Website

Kerala State Film Award winners
Malayalam film score composers
Living people
1939 births
Musicians from Kochi
Film musicians from Kerala
20th-century Indian composers
21st-century Indian composers
Indian male film score composers
20th-century male musicians
21st-century male musicians
Cornell University alumni
Recipients of the Kerala Sangeetha Nataka Akademi Award